Daniel Omelio, often known by his stage name "Robopop", is a producer and songwriter based in Los Angeles. He is best known for his work on successful singles by Maroon 5, Gym Class Heroes and Lana Del Rey.

Discography

References

External links

American record producers
Living people
Year of birth missing (living people)
American electronic musicians
American pop musicians
American rock musicians